The Yamaha YZ450FX is an off-road performance motorcycle made by Yamaha Motor Company. It currently has a  liquid-cooled single-cylinder engine. First offered in 2016 at 450cc, it shared many components and design concepts with both the Yamaha WR450F and Yamaha YZ450F motocross model.   The 2016 model premiered as a closed-course, competition GNCC/Woods racer.  The YZ450FX features a wide ratio transmission, 18" wheel, electric start and kickstand.

First Generation - 2016-2018 
The first generation YZ450FX was introduced in 2016 and continued through 2018.  2018 is the last year to support a kickstarter.

Second Generation - 2019-2020 

The second generation YZ450FX was introduced in 2019 and featured an all new engine, updated suspension settings, revised chassis, and a wireless, smartphone based engine tuning app.  The kickstarter was removed for this generation and cannot be added.

Third Generation - 2021-Present 
The third generation YZ450FX was introduced in 2021 and featured a lighter cylinder head, new camshafts and piston, and a longer connecting rod.  The third generation YZ450FX chassis shares the same chassis as the YZ450F.

See also 
 Yamaha WR450F
 Yamaha YZ450F

References 

YZ450FX
Off-road motorcycles
Motorcycles introduced in 2016